Haft Cheshmeh is a village in Deh Pain Rural District, in the Central District of Ilam County, Ilam Province, Iran. At the 2006 census, its population was 3,497, in 700 families. The village is populated by Kurds.

References 

Populated places in Ilam County
Kurdish settlements in Ilam Province